The twelfth legislative assembly election of Tamil Nadu was held on 10 May 2001. All India Anna Dravida Munnetra Kazhagam (AIADMK)-led front won the elections and its general secretary, J. Jayalalithaa was sworn in as Chief Minister, even though she could not legally run as MLA in this election. She was unanimously nominated as Chief Minister by her party and was ready to serve her second term.  But due to criminal and corruption charges from her first term, on 21 September 2001, a five-judge constitutional bench of the Supreme Court of India ruled in a unanimous verdict that "a person who is convicted for a criminal offense and sentenced to imprisonment for not less than two years cannot be appointed the Chief Minister of a State under Article 164 (1) read with (4) and cannot continue to function as such". Thereby, the bench decided that "in the appointment of Dr. J. Jayalalithaa as Chief Minister there has been a clear infringement of a Constitutional provision and that a writ of quo warranto must issue". In effect, her appointment as Chief Minister was declared null and invalid with retrospective effect. Therefore, technically, she was not the Chief Minister in the period between 14 May 2001 and 21 September 2001. After her resignation on 21 September 2001, she put in O. Panneerselvam, as the official 13th Chief Minister of Tamil Nadu, until she could clear up the charges from her first term, so she can take up the mantle of Chief Minister officially, on 2 March 2002.

Background and Coalition
The incumbent party, Dravida Munnetra Kazhagam, finished its full 5 terms, for the first time since winning the 1967 state assembly election. According to various sources and exit polls, the incumbent party was supposed to retain power, due to the popularity of its leader M. Karunanidhi.  Due to the anti-incumbency factor, problems of development cited by the people in many areas of Tamil Nadu, and a broad coalition formed by AIADMK, including Tamil Maanila Congress, who left the alliance of Dravida Munnetra Kazhagam (DMK), because they joined BJP and the National Democratic Alliance (NDA), Pattali Makkal Katchi (PMK), Indian National Congress and the left parties, the AIADMK led front, with its general secretary J. Jayalalithaa, won by a landslide, sweeping across the state.

The coalition at the AIADMK led-center would prove to be short-lived, since in less than a year, Pattali Makkal Katchi, and its leader Dr. Ramdoss, left the coalition, citing authoritarian type rule by J. Jayalalithaa. Also the Tamil Maanila Congress, who proved to be an important ally for the victory of AIADMK, would later merge with Indian National Congress, who would later support DMK led front in future elections. The left parties would also end up joining the DMK led front, leaving the AIADMK coalition after this election.

Seat allotments
Source: Various Sources

DMK-NDA Alliance

AIADMK-INC Alliance

Opinion polling

Exit polls

Results

Results by Pre-Poll Alliance 

|-
! style="background-color:#E9E9E9;text-align:left;vertical-align:top;" |Alliance/Party
!style="width:4px" |
! style="background-color:#E9E9E9;text-align:right;" |Seats won
! style="background-color:#E9E9E9;text-align:right;" |Change
! style="background-color:#E9E9E9;text-align:right;" |Popular Vote
! style="background-color:#E9E9E9;text-align:right;" |Vote %
! style="background-color:#E9E9E9;text-align:right;" |Adj. %‡
|-
! style="background-color:#009900; color:white"|AIADMK+ alliance
! style="background-color: " |
| 196
| +138
| 14,043,980
|style="text-align:center;vertical-align:middle;" colspan=2 | 50.1%
|-
|AIADMK
! style="background-color: #008000" | 
| 132
| +127
| 8,815,387
| 31.4%
| 52.1%
|-
|TMC(M)
! style="background-color: #008080" |
| 23
| -15
| 1,885,726
| 6.7%
| 47.5%
|-
|PMK
! style="background-color: #800080" |
| 20
| +16
| 1,557,500
| 5.6%
| 46.8%
|-
|INC
! style="background-color: #00FFFF" |
| 7
| +7
| 696,205
| 2.5%
| 45.4%
|-
|CPI(M)
! style="background-color: #000080" |
| 6
| +4
| 470,736
| 1.7%
| 48.2%
|-
|CPI
! style="background-color: #0000FF" |
| 5
| -3
| 444,710
| 1.6%
| 48.5%
|-
|IND
! style="background-color: Black" |
| 2
| +2
| 103,971
| 0.4%
| 46.6%
|-
|AIFB
! style="background-color: #800000" |
| 1
| +1
| 39,248
| 0.1%
| 43.3%
|-
|MUL
! style="background-color: " |
| 0
| -1
| 30,497
| 0.1%
| 41.7%
|-
! style="background-color:#FF0000; color:white"|DMK+ alliance
! style="background-color: Red" |
| 37
| -138
| 10,841,157
|style="text-align:center;vertical-align:middle;" colspan=2 | 38.7%
|-
|DMK
! style="background-color: Red" |
| 31
| -142
| 8,669,864
| 30.9%
| 39.0%
|-
|BJP
! style="background-color: " |
| 4
| +3
| 895,352
| 3.2%
| 38.7%
|-
|MADMK
! style="background-color: #FFFF00" |
| 2
| +1
| 129,474
| 0.5%
| 37.1%
|-
|PT
! style="background-color: " |
| 0
| –
| 355,171
| 1.3%
| 33.8%
|-
|MTD
! style="background-color: " |
| 0
| –
| 257,126
| 0.9%
| 40.9%
|-
|PNK
! style="background-color: " |
| 0
| –
| 196,740
| 0.7%
| 33.6%
|-
|MGRK
! style="background-color: " |
| 0
| –
| 136,916
| 0.5%
| 40.8%
|-
|TB
! style="background-color: " |
| 0
| –
| 45,002
| 0.2%
| 40.0%
|-
|CNMK
! style="background-color: " |
| 0
| –
| 40,421
| 0.1%
| 32.4%
|-
|IND
! style="background-color: " |
| 0
| –
| 115,091
| 0.4%
| 36.7%
|-
! style="background-color:Black; color:white"|Others
! style="background-color: Black" |
| 1
| –
| 3,192,598
|style="text-align:center;vertical-align:middle;" colspan=2 |11.4%
|-
|MDMK
! style="background-color: " |
| 0
| –
| 1,304,469
| 4.7%
| 5.1%
|-
|IND
! style="background-color: #4d4d4d" |
| 1
| –
| 1,509,378
| 6.2%
| 6.3%
|-
| style="text-align:center;" |Total
! style="background-color: " |
| 234
| –
| 28,037,314
| 100%
| –
|-
|}
Note: Parties that contested under "rising-sun" or "two-leaves" symbol are listed as DMK or AIADMK respectively. Parties that ran their candidates as independents, (e.g. Indian Uzhavar Uzhaippalar Katchi and Thondar Congress in DMK alliance) are listed as IND for their respective alliance.
‡: Vote % reflects the percentage of votes the party received compared to the entire electorate that voted in this election. Adjusted (Adj.) Vote %, reflects the average % of votes the party received per constituency that they contested.
 Sources: Election Commission of India and Rediff Newspaper

Constituency wise results

 Thanga Tamilselvan, AIADMK legislator from Andipatti, resigned his seat in 2002, to enable Jayalalithaa to contest here.  This enabled her to win in a by election in Andipatti,  and be Chief Minister of Tamil Nadu.  She succeeded O. Panneerselvam who took over as chief minister for 6 months, until Jayalalithaa's corruption charges were cleared in court.
 Due to the death of V. Perumal, actor turned politician Radha Ravi (son of M.R. Radha) was fielded by AIADMK, and defeated the DMK candidate Subramanian, in a by-election, increasing the majority of the AIADMK.
 During 31 May 2002, By-election, A. Boovaraghamoorthy of the AIADMK, defeated D. Parvendhan of PMK, which resulted in AIADMK to pick up Acharapakkam (SC).

See also 
 Elections in Tamil Nadu
 Legislature of Tamil Nadu
 Government of Tamil Nadu

References

Further reading

External links
 Election Commission of India
 Rediff – Graphic: How Amma swept TN in '01

State Assembly elections in Tamil Nadu
2000s in Tamil Nadu
Tamil Nadu
May 2001 events in India